Local elections were held in Moldova on 25 May 2003, with a runoff for mayors on 8 June 2003.

Party of Communists of the Republic of Moldova (PCRM) performed most strongly overall, securing 41.1% of mayoralties, control of 54.6% of municipal councils, and control of 49.9% of local councils.

References 

2003 in Moldova
Local elections in Moldova
2003 elections in Moldova